The 1986 Big South Conference baseball tournament was the postseason baseball tournament for the Big South Conference, held from May 13 through 15, 1986, on the campus of Augusta State University in Augusta, Georgia. Four teams participated in the double-elimination tournament. The Big South played the season at the NCAA Division I level, but did not receive an automatic bid to the 1986 NCAA Division I baseball tournament.  won the championship.

Format 
The top four finishers from the regular season qualified for the tournament.

Bracket and results

All-Tournament Team

Most Valuable Player 
Terry Spires was named Tournament Most Valuable Player. Spires was a shortstop for Coastal Carolina.

References 

Tournament
Big South Conference Baseball Tournament
Big South baseball tournament
Big South Conference baseball tournament